Runs of Homozygosity (ROH) are contiguous lengths of homozygous genotypes that are present in an individual due to parents transmitting identical haplotypes to their offspring.  

The potential of predicting or estimating individual autozygosity for a subpopulation is the proportion of the autosomal genome above a specified length, termed Froh.

This technique can be used to identify the genomic footprint of inbreeding in conservation programs, as organisms that have undergone recent inbreeding will exhibit long runs of homozygosity. For example, the step-wise reintroduction strategy of the Alpine Ibex in the Swiss Alps created several strong population bottlenecks that reduced the genetic diversity of the newly introduced individuals. The effect of inbreeding in the resulting sub-populations could be studied by measuring the runs of homozygosity in different individuals

References 

DNA sequencing